Syritta oceanica is a species of syrphid fly in the family Syrphidae.

Distribution
Hawaii, Cook Islands, Society Islands, Marquesas Islands.

References

Eristalinae
Diptera of Asia
Taxa named by Pierre-Justin-Marie Macquart
Insects described in 1855